Jakub Bieroński (born 18 April 2003) is a Polish professional footballer who plays as a midfielder for Podbeskidzie Bielsko-Biała.

Career statistics

Club

References 

2003 births
People from Staszów County
Sportspeople from Świętokrzyskie Voivodeship
Living people
Polish footballers
Association football midfielders
Podbeskidzie Bielsko-Biała players
Ekstraklasa players
I liga players
Poland youth international footballers